A Merrie Christmas to You is the fourteenth studio album, and the first Christmas album, released by Canadian country rock band Blue Rodeo on November 4, 2014. It contains eight covers of Christmas songs, along with two originals by Greg Keelor and Jim Cuddy. One original song, "Glad to Be Alive", was previously recorded on Blue Rodeo's 2002 album Palace of Gold.

Track listing

References

Blue Rodeo albums
2014 Christmas albums
Christmas albums by Canadian artists
Country Christmas albums